Philipp Sichler (born 16 July 1974) is a German cinematographer.

Life and career 
Philipp Sichler, born 1974 in Spaichingen has studied at the Film Academy Baden-Württemberg 1999-2004 camera. Then he worked for movie productions and television productions as a cameraman. In 2007 he was awarded the Deutscher Fernsehpreis for the Best Cinematography for the TV movie Sperling und die kalte Angst.

Awards 
 2012: Deutscher Fernsehpreis-Nomination for Best TV Movie Hannah Mangold&Lucy Palm
 2010: Deutscher Fernsehpreis-Nomination for Best TV Mini-Series Vulkan
 2010: Adolf Grimme-Preis-Nomination for Up! Up! to the sky
 2008: Adolf Grimme-Preis-Nomination for Sperling und die kalte Angst
 2007: Deutscher Fernsehpreis for Best Cinematographer Sperling und die kalte Angst     
 2007: Deutscher Filmkunstpreis for Peer Gynt  
 2004: First Steps Award for Katze im Sack

Selected filmography
 2005: Katze im Sack
 2006: Peer Gynt
 2007: Sperling und die kalte Angst
 2008: Werther
 2009: 
 2012: Tatort: Der traurige König
 2013: Tatort: Macht und Ohnmacht
 2014: Tatort: 
 2015: Driften

References

External links

 Philipp Sichler in: BVKamera 
 Philipp Sichler in: Filmportal 

1974 births
Living people
German cinematographers
People from Tuttlingen (district)
Mass media people from Baden-Württemberg